Prasiola is a genus of fresh water and marine green algae. Each individual plant is small but they usually grow side by side to form a green turf on rock surfaces. The genus has a cosmopolitan distribution.

Occurrence 

Freshwater species in this genus are common in cold water streams.

Reproduction 
Asexual reproduction occurs by fragmentation or spores. While in sexual reproduction both male and female gametes are produced on the same thalli.

Species 

There are about 25 species in the genus.
Prasiola calophylla
Prasiola crispa
Prasiola fangchengensis
Prasiola flotowii 
Prasiola furfuracea
Prasiola meridionalis
Prasiola minuta
Prasiola novaezelandiae
Prasiola snareana
Prasiola sneareana
Prasiola stipitata
Prasiola volcanica 
Prasiola linearis
Prasiola sinica
Prasiola tibetica
Prasiola yunnanica

References

External links

Trebouxiophyceae genera
Prasiolales